The Sarawak People's Energy Party (abbreviated TERAS) was a political party in Malaysia. It is among the 20 new parties to have their registration approved by the Registrar of Societies (RoS) and received permission to operate as a political party in 2013.

At its inception, TERAS was a splinter party of Barisan Nasional (BN), Sarawak Progressive Democratic Party (SPDP), set-up by its disgruntled leaders led by William Mawan Ikom and was pro-BN following a leadership crisis in the party and also some elected members from Sarawak United People's Party (SUPP). However the hopes of TERAS to join BN were rejected by the coalition.

TERAS had managed to attract a total of 11 people's elected representatives to join it in May 2014. But a few weeks later, Wong Soon Koh and four state assemblymen quit TERAS to join United People's Party (UPP), an offshoot of SUPP. An arrangementcomponent was made between TERAS and Barisan Nasional for the division of seats contested in the 2016 Sarawak state election.

On 11 May 2016, TERAS had decided and supposed to be officially dissolved itself in order to allow their members, who won as direct BN candidates, to join any component party of the coalition. But its plans was put on hold and even cancelled while watching developments of the 2018 general election.

On 28 October 2021, Banyi Beriak, who was TERAS initial Secretary General when it was formed in 2013 before quitting in 2018 to join UPP and PSB later, announced he had left PSB to return to TERAS to take over the president post of the party. He also announced it would field candidates in up-coming 2021 Sarawak state election then in December 2021 but only to be scrapped for lacking of preparation by the party.

State election results

References

External links 
 https://hornbillunleashed.wordpress.com/2014/11/23/spdp-declares-war-on-teras-in-sarawak-polls/
 https://hornbillunleashed.wordpress.com/2014/07/31/61765/
 https://hornbillunleashed.wordpress.com/2013/09/04/49827/
 https://hornbillunleashed.wordpress.com/2015/04/21/spdp-names-its-sarawak-election-candidates/
 https://hornbillunleashed.wordpress.com/2015/05/01/spdp-supp-ready-to-do-battle-to-defend-what-are-rightly-theirs/

See also 
 Politics of Malaysia
 List of political parties in Malaysia

Political parties in Sarawak
Political parties established in 2014
2014 establishments in Malaysia